Blachea longicaudalis is an eel in the family Congridae (conger/garden eels). It was described by Emma Stanislavovna Karmovskaya in 2004. It is a marine, deep water-dwelling eel which is known from Fiji and New Caledonia, in the western Pacific Ocean. It dwells at a depth range of 400–461 metres. Males can reach a maximum total length of 68.3 centimetres, while females can reach a maximum TL of 57 cm.

The species epithet "longicaudalis" refers to the eel's elongated caudal fins.

References

Congridae
Fish described in 2004